Chryst is an Austrian avant-garde/extreme metal one-man band formed in 1990, initially under the name Korova, then changing its name to Korovakill and finally to Chryst.

Their former name, Russian for "cow" (Корова), is also an allusion to the "Korova Milk Bar" of Anthony Burgess' famous novel A Clockwork Orange.

History
The band that would become Chryst was formed in 1990 in Innsbruck, Austria, initially bearing the name Korova, by Christof Niederwieser (who would futurely provide vocals for Angizia's first two studio albums), Michael Kröll, Moritz Neuner (of Dornenreich, Abigor, Graveworm, Leaves' Eyes and Angizia fame) and Georg Razesberger. They would release their first studio album, A Kiss in the Charnel Fields, in 1995.

In 1997, Michael and Georg left the band, and were replaced by Florian Oberlechner (also of Angizia), Herwing Huber, Susanne Eckbauer and Martina Astner; Moritz Neuner remained. With this line-up, Korova released their second full-length, Dead Like an Angel, in 1998. This would be their last release under the moniker "Korova"; two years later, they changed their name to Korovakill.

Christof and Moritz teamed up with Renaud Tschirner, famous for being the keyboard player for Elend, to continue as Korovakill, now a trio. They would release their first (and only) studio album under this moniker, Waterhells, in 2001. Waterhells was chosen as the 7th best experimental metal album of the 2000s by the webzine AGM.

On 21 September 2011, Christof released a solo album, PhantasmaChronica, under the moniker Chryst. On Chryst's official website he said of the band's name change: Chryst is a deconstruction of the Occident. He's the birth of a new world, an inverse universe, created to change your world forever. The revelation is near. Chryst will open the doors of your perception and unearth the hidden treasures of your imagination. The transformation of Korovakill into Chryst is not just a change of name. It's a completely new era of musical revolution!

Band members

Current members
 Christof Niederwieser – vocals, guitar, keyboards (1990–present)

Past members
 Moritz Neuner – drums (1990–2011)
 Renaud Tschirner – keyboards (2000–2011)
 Michael Kröll – bass (1990–1997)
 Georg Razesberger – guitars (1990–1997)
 Florian Oberlechner – bass, accordion (1997–2000)
 Herwing Huber – guitars (1997–2000)
 Susanne Eckbauer – theremin, glass organ (1997–2000)
 Martina Astner – vocals (1997–2001)

Timeline

Discography
 1995: A Kiss in the Charnel Fields (as Korova)
 1998: Dead Like an Angel (as Korova)
 2001: Waterhells (as Korovakill)
 2011: PhantasmaChronica (as Chryst)

References

External links
 

Avant-garde metal musical groups
Austrian black metal musical groups
Musical groups established in 1990
1990 establishments in Austria
One-man bands